Coclé del Norte is a corregimiento in Donoso District, Colón Province, Panama with a population of 3,555 as of 2010. Its population as of 1990 was 2,377; its population as of 2000 was 2,386.

References

Corregimientos of Colón Province
Road-inaccessible communities of Panama